Long Walk, A Long Walk or The Long Walk may refer to:

Historical events 
 Long Walk of the Navajo, the 1864 deportation and attempted ethnic cleansing of the Navajo people by the U.S. Government
 The Long Walk, an annual event and charity inspired by Michael Long's 2004 walk to Canberra to highlight Indigenous Australian issues
 The March (1945), also known as the Long Walk, westward marches by groups of Allied POWs from German camps during the final stages of World War II in Europe

Places 
 The Long Walk, a straight tree-lined avenue in Windsor Great Park, running for 2.5 miles (4 km) roughly southwards from Windsor Castle
 The Long Walk, a promenade to one side of the Spanish Arch in Galway, Ireland
 Trinity College Long Walk, the core of Trinity College, Hartford, Connecticut

Media

Film and television
 A Long Walk (film), a 2006 Japanese film
 The Long Walk (film), a 2019 Laotian film

Literature
 The Long Walk: The True Story of a Trek to Freedom (1956), a memoir by Polish author Sławomir Rawicz
 The Long Walk (Judge Dredd), from the British comic book series Judge Dredd
 The Long Walk (1979), a novel by Stephen King (under the pseudonym Richard Bachman)
 The Long Walk: A Story of War and the Life That Follows (2013), a memoir by Iraq War veteran Brian Castner

Music
 "A Long Walk" (song), a 2001 song by Jill Scott
 The Long Walk (album), 2018 album by Uniform

See also 
 Lone walk, the traditional exit by the Governor of Massachusetts from the Massachusetts State House on his or her last day in office
 Long March (disambiguation)
 The Long Run (disambiguation)
 Long Walk to Forever (disambiguation)
 Long Walk to Freedom (disambiguation)
 Long Walk Home (disambiguation)